Moss Bluff is an unincorporated community in Liberty County, Texas, United States.

Education
Moss Bluff is zoned to schools in the Liberty Independent School District.

References

External links

Unincorporated communities in Liberty County, Texas
Unincorporated communities in Texas